William Earl Callihan (May 15, 1916 – August 23, 1986) was a professional American football running back in the National Football League. A 9th round selection (77th overall pick) out of Nebraska in the 1939 NFL Draft, Callihan played for six seasons for the Detroit Lions (1940–1945).

References

1916 births
1986 deaths
People from Keith County, Nebraska
American football running backs
Nebraska Cornhuskers football players
Detroit Lions players